Mother Neff State Park is a  state park located on the Leon River west of Moody, Texas in Coryell County. The park is part of Mother Neff State Park and F.A.S. 21-B(1) Historic District, which was added to the National Register of Historic Places on October 2, 1992.

The park's initial  were donated by Mrs. Isabella Eleanor Neff, mother of Governor Pat Morris Neff in 1916. Upon her death in 1921, Governor Neff created the Mother Neff Memorial Park, making it the first state park in Texas. The additional land was deeded to the state in 1934 by private owners; Governor Neff deeded  and Mr Frank Smith deeded . The park was opened to the public in 1937.

Company 817 of the Civilian Conservation Corps built the park from 1934 to 1938. The Company quarried stone and cut wood to build the structures that are still in use in the park today.

Most of Mother Neff Park sits in the flood plain of the Leon River and flooding shut the park down in 1992 and again in 2007.

Texas F.A.S. [federally assisted secondary road] 21-B(1) (County Road 314 locally known as Old River Road or Oglesby Neff Park Road) is a  length of road built in 1939. The Texas State Highway Department constructed the road using allocated federal funds. The road follows the Leon River for much of its length from the west entrance of the park to Farm to Market Road 107.

See also

List of Texas state parks
National Register of Historic Places listings in Coryell County, Texas

References

External links

Texas Parks and Wildlife Department: Mother Neff State Park

State parks of Texas
Protected areas of Coryell County, Texas
Civilian Conservation Corps in Texas
Coryell County, Texas